Seattle Center Arena may refer to the following arenas in Seattle:

 KeyArena, a multi-purpose arena, will be renamed Seattle Center Arena when renovations are complete.
 Mercer Arena, formerly Seattle Center Arena, a performing arts venue on Mercer Street and Fourth Avenue North